The 2015–16 season  was the 44th edition of the National Basketball League of England. Manchester Magic won their second league title.

NBL1

Regular season

Playoffs

Quarter-finals

Semi-finals

Final

NBL2

Regular season

Playoffs

Quarter-finals

Semi-finals

Final

NBL3

Regular season

North Division

South Division

Playoffs

Quarter-finals

Semi-finals

NBL Development League

Regular season

North East

South East

North West

South

South West

Playoffs

First round

Quarter-finals

Semi-finals

Final

References

English Basketball League seasons
English
English
Basketball
Basketball